The International Review of Pragmatics is a biannual peer-reviewed academic journal covering research in pragmatics and related disciplines. It was established in 2009 and is published by Brill Publishers. The editor-in-chief is Piotr Cap (University of Lodz).

Abstracting and indexing
The journal is abstracted and indexed in:
CSA Linguistics and Language Behavior Abstracts
Emerging Sources Citation Index
ERIH PLUS
Linguistic Bibliography
MLA International Bibliography

References

External links
 

Pragmatics journals
Publications established in 2009
English-language journals
Biannual journals
Brill Publishers academic journals